This is a list of governors of the Austrian state of Styria:

See also
Styria

Lists
Styria
Governors